is a JR West Geibi Line station located in Karuga-chō, Asakita-ku, Hiroshima, Hiroshima Prefecture, Japan. The station services many express and local trains daily.

History
1915-04-28: Karuga Station opens
1937-07-01: Karuga Station is nationalized and becomes part of Japanese National Railways
1987-04-01: Japanese National Railways is privatized, and Karuga Station becomes a JR West station

Station building and platforms
Karuga Station features one island platform capable of handling two lines simultaneously. The station building was completed in 1953 and is an old-style wooden building with a tile roof. The station is privately operated under contract from JR West, and tickets can be purchased inside the station building.

Environs
Karuga Post Office
Hiroshima Municipal Kariogawa Elementary School
Nakayama
Nabetsuchi Pass
Misasa River

Highway access
 Hiroshima Prefectural Route 37 (Hiroshima-Miyoshi Route)

Connecting lines
All lines are JR West lines. 
Geibi Line
Miyoshi Express
No stop
Commuter Liner
Shirakiyama Station — Karuga Station — Shimofukawa Station
Miyoshi Liner
Mukaihara Station — Karuga Station — Kamifukawa Station
Local
Shirakiyama Station — Karuga Station — Kamifukawa Station

External links
 JR West

Railway stations in Hiroshima Prefecture
Geibi Line
Hiroshima City Network
Stations of West Japan Railway Company in Hiroshima city
Railway stations in Japan opened in 1915